Karim Achoui (born 1967) is a French-Algerian lawyer. 

He is notable for his alleged connections with the French milieu, the French mafia, and for his involvement in several significant cases, which have earned him the nickname "avocat des voyous," or advocate of thugs in the media.

He is the founder of the League of Judicial Defense of Muslims (Ligue de défense judiciaire des musulmans in French). Boulogne-Billancourt

Early life and education 
Karim Achoui was born in Boulogne-Billancourt into a modest home. His mother was a wet nurse, or nanny, and his father was an employee at Renault, an automobile company. Both his parents were from Algeria. He studied medicine and law simultaneously before choosing to pursue law and prepare for a career as an attorney. He began practicing as a criminal defense lawyer in 1993 in Paris.

Career 
Karim Achoui began his legal career the Court of Paris in January 1993. He began working with his former lecturer, Jean-Marc Florand, who was known for serving on the benches of Paris-Est Créteil Val-de-Marne University.

In his office, Karim Achoui worked on some of Jacque Vergès' cases, including the case of Patrick Dils, a man convicted of killing two children in 1989 and was sentenced to life in prison. After new evidence resurfaced, Dils was later acquitted on April 24, 2002. 

Achoui started his own firm in 2000 and won several cases that were highly publicized, including the acquittals of Michel "Le Gros" Lepage, a heavyweight for a gang in the South side, and Marc "Le Forain" Hornec, one of the three brothers of the influential Montreuil-sous-Bois family. Achoui also represented several Islamists, which aroused the interest of the Directorate of Territorial Surveillance. 

Among Achoui's clients were Karl Zéro, Jamel Debbouze, Richard Gasquet, the Hornec brothers, Romane Bohringer, Farid Khider et Christine Chauvet.

In November 2006, Achoui defended Sami Naceri, an actor and producer who had thrown an ashtray at a stylist in a bar a year previously. In 2007, the actor was sentenced to 10 months in prison.

Assassination attempt 
Karim Achoui was shot twice while leaving his office in Paris on June 22, 2007. He was admitted to the Georges-Pompidou European Hospital where he spent two weeks recovering before being permitted to leave.

Shortly before the attack, he allegedly told the president of the Paris Bar Association that he was being investigated and his office had been infiltrated by police. He was quoted as saying (in French), "On June 4, I was informed that one of my secretaries was acting as an informant to the police. I informed the bâtonnier and dismissed the secretary. I am convinced that the attack against me is connected to this infiltration."

Four men were eventually arrested for the attack. One of them, Ruddy Terranova, was proved to be a police informant. Achoui positively identified him as the shooter. The other three men were determined to be intermediaries and a part of organized crime.

References 

20th-century French lawyers
21st-century French lawyers
Organized crime in France
Criminal defense lawyers
1967 births
Living people